The Abrolhos Marine National Park is a national park that was established in 1983 covering most of the Abrolhos Archipelago area in the state of Bahia, Brazil.

Location

The park was established on 6 April 1983.
It became part of the Central Atlantic Forest Ecological Corridor, created in 2002.
It is located off the southern coast of the Bahia in the north east of Brazil.
The islands are volcanic in origin.

There are five islands in the Abrolhos archipelago but only one of them, Siriba, is open to visitors. A  trail runs round this island.
Ilha Santa Bárbara is outside the park boundary.
It is under the jurisdiction of the navy, which maintains a navigation beacon there.
The other islands are Ilha Guarita, Ilha Redonda, Ilha Sueste.
The park also includes the Parcel dos Abrolhos, where typical coral formations of the region may be seen, and the Timbebas reef opposite the city of Alcobaça.

Ecology

The waters are clear and there is great diversity of underwater flora and fauna, including flourishing coral formations.
The island vegetation is mainly low, small plants such as grasses and herbs.
Seabirds include the white bellied booby, terns, frigates, jays and woodpeckers.
Charles Darwin visited the archipelago in 1830 and was impressed by the variety of species, including birds, lizards and spiders.

Ilha Guarita and Ilha Sueste are home to many seabirds. 
Frigate birds nest on the steep sides of Ilha Redonda, which is visited by loggerhead turtles for spawning in the summer.
Diving along the reefs and the Rosalinda shipwreck is allowed, and humpback whales may be observed from boats.
Since 2003 the park has been an outpost of the Atlantic Forest Biosphere Reserve (RBMA: Reserva de Biosfera da Mata Atlântica).
In 2010 it was recognized as a Ramsar Site.

References

Sources

National parks of Brazil
Protected areas of Bahia
Ramsar sites in Brazil